Benjamin Bocquelet (born June 27, 1980) is a French-British animator, writer, director and producer, best known as the creator of the hit Cartoon Network animated series The Amazing World of Gumball. He was also the director of a short film called The Hell's Kitchen in 2003. When Cartoon Network Development Studio Europe was created in 2007, Bocquelet was hired in order to help people pitch their projects to Cartoon Network after the dismissal of Nickelodeon and Jetix subdivisions of Europe. However, when the studio decided to have its employees all pitch their own ideas, he decided to take some of the rejected characters he had created for commercials and put them all in one series, with a school setting. Daniel Lennard and Khaki Jones and Brian Miller, the Vice President of Original Series and Development at Turner Broadcasting Systems,  liked the idea and the series was ultimately greenlit.

Career

The Amazing World of Gumball

After leaving Studio AKA, the creative director at the studio encouraged Bocquelet to join the new Cartoon Network studio in London, Cartoon Network Development Studio Europe. He received a job there helping other people pitch their ideas to Cartoon Network, and came up with his own idea while doing so. He pitched his idea to the producers. His idea was a show called Gumball about reject cartoon characters attending a remedial school, but producers felt this concept was too sad. He then revised this idea and made it more cheery, taking on the structure of a family sitcom. The producers liked this idea, and work went underway for what would become The Amazing World of Gumball, which premiered on Cartoon Network on May 3, 2011. He named some characters after his relatives (Nicole, Richard, and Anais were named after his mother, father, and sister, respectively). In October 2011, Bocquelet revealed in a Twitter post that the Wattersons themselves were named after Bill Watterson, the author of the comic book Calvin and Hobbes.

On September 6, 2016, Bocquelet said that he was departing from the show after the completion of Season 6, but production would continue. However, on October 7, 2018, he retweeted that the show would end after the sixth season, though the author of the article made a follow-up article saying that more seasons are still possible.
Following the series finale of The Amazing World of Gumball, and the mixed reviews it received from fans, Bocquelet said that he would create a film to resolve its cliffhanger. The film was officially announced on February 17, 2021, under the working title The Amazing World of Gumball Movie. On September 21, 2021, HBO Max and Cartoon Network announced the film had been greenlit and was now titled The Amazing World of Gumball: The Movie!. The film will serve as Bocquelet's directorial debut.

Filmography

Film

Television

References

External links

1980 births
Living people
French animators
English animators
British animated film directors
French animated film directors
British screenwriters
French screenwriters
Cartoon Network Studios people
Showrunners
British television directors
British television producers
French television directors
French television producers
British animated film producers
French animated film producers
British surrealist artists
French surrealist artists
French emigrants to England
The Amazing World of Gumball